"Dream On (An Indian Lullaby)" is a popular song written by B.G. DeSylva with music composed by Victor Herbert. The song is a Cherokee mother's lullaby to her child. The lyrics as first written are:

The first commercial recording of "Dream On" was by Mario Chamlee (Brunswick 10158) in 1925.

References

Bibliography
DeSylva, B.G. (w.); Herbert, Victor (m.). "Dream On" (An Indian Lullaby), (Sheet music). New York: Harms (1922).
Kaye, Joseph. Victor Herbert: The Biography of America's Greatest Composer of Romantic Music. Wrangell-Rokassowsky Press (2007).

1922 songs
Songs with lyrics by Buddy DeSylva